Yang Yu or Yu Yang may refer to:

People surnamed Yang
Yang Yu (swimmer) (born 1985), Chinese female swimmer
Yang Yu (footballer) (born 1985), Chinese football player
Yang Yu (freestyle skier) (born 1991), Chinese freestyle skier, represented China at the 2011 Asian Winter Games
Yang Yü (diplomat) (born 1840), Chinese ambassador to the US and Russia

People surnamed Yu
Yu Yang (field hockey) (born 1979), Chinese field hockey player
Yu Yang (badminton) (born 1986), Chinese female badminton player
Yu Yang (footballer, born 1989), Chinese football player
Yu Yang (footballer, born 1983), Chinese former football player

See also
Yang You (605–619), known as Yang Yu in Wade-Giles, puppet Sui dynasty emperor
Yang Su (diplomat) ( 1410), or Yang Yu in some sources, Joseon diplomat and ambassador to Japan
Yangyu (disambiguation) for a list of places
Yuyang (disambiguation) for a list of places